The 1909 Ottawa Rough Riders finished in 2nd place in the Interprovincial Rugby Football Union with a 5–1 record and qualified for the playoffs for the second straight year. They defeated the Hamilton Tigers in a league playoff, avenging last year's loss, but lost to the Toronto Varsity Blues in the Eastern Final.

Regular season

Standings

Schedule

Postseason

References

Ottawa Rough Riders seasons
1909 in Canadian football
Ottawa Rough Riders